Ricardo Perrone (born 21 December 1976) is a Spanish water polo player who competed in the 2008 Summer Olympics.

See also

 List of World Aquatics Championships medalists in water polo

References

External links
 

1976 births
Living people
Spanish male water polo players
Olympic water polo players of Spain
Water polo players at the 2008 Summer Olympics
World Aquatics Championships medalists in water polo
Naturalised citizens of Spain
Pan American Games medalists in water polo
Pan American Games silver medalists for Brazil
Brazilian male water polo players
Water polo players at the 1995 Pan American Games
Medalists at the 1995 Pan American Games